The Mirror Crack'd is a 1980 British mystery film directed by Guy Hamilton from a screenplay by Jonathan Hales and Barry Sandler, based on Agatha Christie's Miss Marple novel The Mirror Crack'd from Side to Side (1962). It stars Angela Lansbury, Geraldine Chaplin, Tony Curtis, Edward Fox, Rock Hudson, Kim Novak, and Elizabeth Taylor. Scenes were filmed at Twickenham Film Studios, Twickenham, London and on location in Kent.

Plot
In 1953 in the English village of St Mary Mead, home of Miss Jane Marple, a big Hollywood production company arrives to film a costume drama about Mary, Queen of Scots and Elizabeth I with two famous movie stars, Marina Rudd and Lola Brewster. The two actresses are old rivals. Marina is making a much heralded comeback after a prolonged "illness" and retirement (due to what was really a nervous breakdown when her son was born with severe brain damage). She and her husband, Jason Rudd, who is directing the film, arrive with their entourage. When she learns that Lola will be in the film as well, she becomes enraged and vents her anger. Lola then arrives with her husband, Marty Fenn, who is producing the film.

Excitement runs high in the village as the locals have been invited to a reception held by the film company in a manor house, Gossington Hall, to meet the celebrities. Lola and Marina come face to face at the reception and exchange some comically potent insults, as they smile and pose for the cameras.

At the reception Marina is cornered by a gushing, devoted fan, Heather Babcock, who bores her with a long and detailed story about having actually met Marina in person during the Second World War. After recounting the meeting they had all those years ago, when she arose from her sickbed to go and meet the glamorous star, Heather drinks a cocktail that was made for Marina and quickly dies from poisoning. Everyone is certain Marina was the intended murder victim. Not only has Marina been receiving anonymous death threats made up of newspaper clippings, once shooting begins on the film she discovers that her cup of coffee on the set has also been spiked with poison, sending her into fits of terror. The police detective from Scotland Yard investigating the case, Inspector Dermot Craddock, is baffled. He asks his aunt, who happens to be Jane Marple, who recently injured her foot at the reception and is therefore confined to her home, for help. The suspects are Ella Zielinsky, Jason's assistant who is secretly in love with him and would like Marina out of the way, and the hotheaded actress Lola.

The main suspect, Ella Zielinsky, after going to a pay phone in the village where she telephoned and threatened to expose the murderer, is then killed by a lethal nasal spray substituted for her hay-fever medication.

Miss Marple, now back on her feet, visits Gossington Hall, where Marina and Jason are staying, and views where Heather's death occurred. Working from information received from her cleaning woman, Cherry Baker, who worked as a waitress the day of the murder, Marple begins to piece together the events and solves the mystery. By that time, however, another death occurs at Gossington Hall, which explains who was the killer: Marina Rudd has apparently died by suicide.

Miss Marple explains that Heather Babcock's story was Marina's motive. Heather suffered from German measles, a rather harmless disease to most adults, but dangerous for a pregnant woman. Heather innocently infected Marina when she met her during the Second World War while Marina was pregnant: she had caused Marina's child to be born with mental retardation. Upon hearing Heather cheerfully tell this story, Marina was overcome with rage and deliberately poisoned her. She then spread the idea that she was the intended victim, concocting the death threats and poisoning her own coffee. Ella, who in fact made phone calls to various suspects from a phone box, accidentally guessed correctly, prompting Marina to murder her. Jason confesses to Miss Marple that he had put poison in his wife's hot chocolate to save her from being prosecuted; however, the drink has not been touched. Marina is nonetheless found dead, seeming to have poisoned herself. And as Marina is now dead, she will not be brought to justice.

Cast

 Angela Lansbury as Miss Jane Marple
 Elizabeth Taylor as Marina Gregg-Rudd
 Rock Hudson as Jason Rudd
 Tony Curtis as Martin "Marty" N. Fenn
 Kim Novak as Lola Brewster
 Geraldine Chaplin as Ella Zielinsky 
 Edward Fox as Inspector Dermot Craddock (Jane's nephew)
 Charles Gray as Bates, the butler
 Richard Pearson as Doctor Haydock
 Wendy Morgan as Cherry
 Margaret Courtenay as Mrs Dolly Bantry
 Marella Oppenheim as Margot Bence
 Maureen Bennett as Heather Babcock
 Carolyn Pickles as Miss Giles
 Eric Dodson as the Major
 Charles Lloyd-Pack as the Vicar
 Thick Wilson as the Mayor
 Pat Nye as the Mayoress
 Peter Woodthorpe as the Scout Master
 Norman Wooland as the Medical Examiner
 Richard Leech as Director of Photography
 Sam Kydd as Film Technician
 Pierce Brosnan as actor playing Jamie (uncredited) in the scene about 76 minutes in.

In addition, Anthony Steel, Dinah Sheridan, Nigel Stock, Hildegard Neil, John Bennett and Allan Cuthbertson are among the actors who appear in Murder at Midnight, a black and white 'teaser' movie shown at the beginning of the film. Natalie Wood was originally chosen to play the role eventually played by Elizabeth Taylor.

Margaret Courtenay later appeared in the BBC TV adaptation The Mirror Crack'd from Side to Side starring Joan Hickson as Miss Marple.

Production
The novel was published in 1962. In 1977 Warners announced that Helen Hayes would play Miss Marple in adaptations of A Caribbean Mystery and The Mirror Crack'd.

Film rights for Mirror passed to John Brabourne and Richard Goodwin, who had previously produced adaptations of Murder on the Orient Express  (1974) and Death on the Nile (1978). In 1979 they announced they would make the film starring Angela Lansbury who had played a support role in Death on the Nile and was appearing on stage in Sweeney Todd. Production would be put on hold until Lansbury finished her run in the musical.

In August 1979, Brabourne suffered leg injuries in a bomb blast that killed his mother, son, and father-in-law, Lord Mountbatten. But he proceeded with the picture.

Guy Hamilton was given the job as director. He told the producers he was not a fan of Agatha Christie's novels and they said that is what would make him ideal for the film. Hamilton described the script as "awfully funny".

Casting director Dyson Lovell said since the film was set in the 1950s "it seemed like a good idea to use stars from that era.". Rock Hudson, Kim Novak, Tony Curtis and Elizabeth Taylor signed to play support roles. Taylor took over from Natalie Wood. Curtis made the film after being fired from the Broadway play I Ought to Be in Pictures.

It was Taylor's first film in three years. She said: "I have said for two years now that I would not go back to films unless it was something that absolutely intrigued me, and something that would not take me away from my husband for too long. I have found just that in The Mirror Crack'd and am longing to work with some very dear friends again."

There had been a series of Miss Marple films in the 1960s starring Margaret Rutherford. Hamilton said Rutherford "was a divine clown but she was no more Miss Marple than... fly to the moon. We are doing Miss Christie's Miss Marple, a more serious person, a gossip, a bit of a snob. And she doesn't fall off her bicycle into the village duckpond."

Lansbury said she played the part of Marple "absolutely straight. I'm trying to get at the woman Agatha Christie created: an Edwardian maiden lady imbued with great humanity and a mind of tremendous breadth. She's very exactly described in the books as tall, pale-complexioned, with twinkling blue eyes and white hair - not a fat galumph of a creature at all. I base my performance on that. Also on the fact that she has tremendous alertness and curiosity allied to a great appetite for murder."

Lansbury signed a three-picture deal, meaning the intention was to make two more Marples.

Filming

St Clere Estate, in Heaverham, part of the Sevenoaks District of Kent, was used as the grand home of Marina Rudd (Elizabeth Taylor) and her husband Jason (Rock Hudson). Ye Olde George Inn and a Bridge on Church Street in Shoreham are both noticeable in the production, doubling as part of the village of St Mary Mead.  The village of Smarden and St Michael's Church are also used to double as the village of St Mary Mead. Also throughout filming the 'Thatched House' cottage in Smarden was used as Miss Marple's cottage. Smarden is located in the Ashford district of Kent, and the traditional thatched houses and village shops made it a perfect filming location. The film was shot on a ten-week schedule from 12 May to 18 July 1980.

"It was fun", said Curtis. "A piece of cake. I didn't have to get all sweaty like in Spartacus' and I had a good time." "I never had so much fun making a movie", said Novak. "It may not be my greatest role, but I didn't have a studio executive breathing down my neck, dictating my every move."

Novak added she and Taylor "both had a lot of funny, bitchy lines to say to each other. In real life, that bitchiness rarely exists on a movie set, but actresses have certainly thought about it a lot. But they've never said it. That's why this movie was so much fun." However, her return to filmmaking was only temporary. "Doing something once in a while, like The Mirror Crack'd, is fine and it makes me feel like Cinderella at the ball. But as a steady diet—no way."

Title
The title—shortened from the one used for Christie's book—is part of a line from "The Lady of Shalott" by English poet Alfred, Lord Tennyson:

Out flew the web and floated wide—
The mirror crack'd from side to side;
"The curse is come upon me", cried
The Lady of Shalott.

Inspiration theory
Biographers theorise that Christie used an incident in the real-life of American film star Gene Tierney as the basis of the plot of The Mirror Crack'd from Side to Side. In June 1943, while pregnant with her first daughter, Tierney contracted German measles during her only appearance at the Hollywood Canteen. Due to Tierney's illness, her daughter was born deaf, partially blind with cataracts, and severely developmentally disabled. Sometime after the tragedy surrounding her daughter's birth, the actress learned from a fan who approached her for an autograph at a tennis party that the woman (who was then a member of the women's branch of the Marine Corps) had sneaked out of quarantine while sick with German measles to meet Tierney at her only Hollywood Canteen appearance. In her autobiography, Tierney wrote that after the woman had recounted her story, "I stood there for a very long minute. There was no point in telling her of the tragedy that had occurred. I turned and walked away very quickly. After that, I didn't care if I was ever again anyone's favorite actress".

The incident, as well as the circumstances under which the information was imparted to the actress, is repeated almost verbatim in Christie's story; Tierney's life experience had been well-publicized.

Reception
The film was considered a box office disappointment in the United States. Lansbury never reprised her performance as Miss Marple.

References

External links

 
 
 
 

1980 films
1980 crime films
1980 thriller films
1980s British films
1980s crime thriller films
1980s English-language films
1980s mystery thriller films
British crime thriller films
British mystery thriller films
EMI Films films
Films about actors
Films about filmmaking
Films based on Miss Marple books
Films directed by Guy Hamilton
Films scored by John Cameron
Films set in 1953
Films set in England
Films shot at Twickenham Film Studios
Films shot in Kent